Sir James Matthew Stronge, 3rd Baronet DL, JP (25 November 1811 – 11 March 1885), succeeded to the baronetcy on the death of his 78-year-old father, Sir James Stronge 2nd baronet, on 2 December 1864. He was a member of the Stronge family and was born in Tynan Abbey, County Armagh. His mother was Isabella Calvert, Lady Stronge, the eldest daughter of Nicholas Calvert M.P., of Hunsdon House, Hertfordshire, and his wife The Hon. Frances Pery, daughter of the Viscount Pery (a Speaker of the Irish House of Commons).

Stronge married, on 17 June 1836, Selina Nugent, daughter of Andrew Nugent of Portaferry, County Down and a niece of John, 3rd Viscount de Vesci. He served as High Sheriff of Armagh for 1843 and High Sheriff of Tyrone for 1844 and deputy lieutenant of County Armagh in 1844 and of County Tyrone in 1845. Stronge was also a Member of Parliament for County Armagh in 1864 and a justice of the peace.

He was commissioned as a Lieutenant in the 21st Foot and served in the 59th Foot, and 5th Dragoon Guards. After retirement from the Regular Army he was appointed Lieutenant-Colonel Commandant of the Royal Tyrone Fusiliers Militia and from 22 April 1862 was Honorary Colonel of the regiment, which became the 4th (Royal Tyrone Militia) Battalion, Royal Inniskilling Fusiliers.

In about 1840, Stronge was responsible for the establishment of the Tynan Harriers, a hunting group, which were regarded as a capable pack.

He died without issue and was succeeded to the baronetcy by his brother, Sir John Stronge.

References

The London Gazette

1811 births
1885 deaths
Baronets in the Baronetage of the United Kingdom
5th Dragoon Guards officers
Royal Scots Fusiliers officers
59th Regiment of Foot officers
Tyrone Militia officers
Deputy Lieutenants of Armagh
Deputy Lieutenants of Tyrone
Members of the Parliament of the United Kingdom for County Armagh constituencies (1801–1922)
UK MPs 1859–1865
UK MPs 1865–1868
UK MPs 1868–1874
High Sheriffs of Armagh
High Sheriffs of Tyrone